State Border of Ukraine (Derzhavnyi Kordon Ukrayiny, for brevity - DerzhKordon) is an international boundary of the state territory of Ukraine. According to Article 1 of the Law of Ukraine on the State Border it is a line and a vertical surface that stretches along that line, which define the boundary of territory of Ukraine over the land, water, and air space.

Protection of the State Border of Ukraine is conducted by the State Border Guard Service of Ukraine (on the ground) and the Armed Forces of Ukraine (in air and underwater). The border was officially established by the Law of Ukraine "On Legal Succession of Ukraine" (September 12, 1991) and "On State Border of Ukraine" (November 4, 1991).

General scope

Ukraine borders with seven countries: Poland, Slovakia, Hungary, Romania, Moldova, Russia, and Belarus. However, the delimitation and the demarcation of the borders with Russia, Belarus, and Moldova (republics of the former Soviet Union) have not been finished. The borders with other countries were inherited from the Soviet border patrol service which was recreated into the Ukrainian after the fall of the Soviet Union.

In 1998, work on border delimitation with Russia began, but has since stalled over sea boundary controversy concerning delimitation of the waters of the Azov Sea and the Kerch Strait. The 2004, Treaty between the Russian Federation and Ukraine on Cooperation in the Use of the Sea of Azov and the Kerch Strait didn't addressed maritime border delimitation leaving it subject to follow-up negotiations and according to Jamestown, Russia stonewalled those negotiations since. Since the start of the Russo-Ukrainian war, Ukraine has begun work on demarcation of borders with Russia and Belarus.

In 1994, the Budapest Memorandum on Security Assurances promised, inter alia, that its signatories (the Russian Federation, the United States of America, and the United Kingdom) would respect Ukraine's existing borders.

Ukraine also exclusively leased until 2017 part of territory of Sevastopol municipality to the Russian Black Sea Fleet for its transition outside of Ukraine to Novorossiysk. In 2010 Kharkiv Agreements were ratified by both sides (Russian and Ukrainian), which extended the lease for addition 25 with optional five-year extension if necessary. The agreements were also part of the Russia–Ukraine gas disputes which sprang out onto the international scale.

Borders with other states 
All territory of Ukraine is consistent and does not have any Ukrainian enclaves in other countries.

On 1 January 2018 Ukraine introduced biometric controls for Russian citizens entering the country. On 22 March 2018, Ukrainian President Petro Poroshenko signed a decree that required Russian citizens and "individuals without citizenship, who come from migration risk countries” (more details were not given) to notify the Ukrainian authorities in advance about their reason for travelling to Ukraine. Since 1 July 2022 Russian citizens need to apply for a visa to enter Ukraine. During the first 4.5 months of the visa regime 10 visas were issued and seven Russian citizens entered Ukraine (mostly for humanitarian reasons).

Also, Ukraine has the Chernobyl Exclusion Zone which has a certain degree of restrictions and surrounded by checkpoints for control of access. Among such checkpoints is the controlled checkpoint Dytiatky.

Sea boundaries 

The southern border of Ukraine stretches as the external boundary of the Ukrainian territorial waters. By sea Ukraine borders with Romania and Russia. To the west Romania - Ukraine border stretches from the edge of its land segment across the Black Sea over the distance of 33 km, after that it is a boundary of the Ukrainian territorial waters and the Romanian Economic Zone. The Ukrainian territorial waters include the Snake Island. From there stretches the Ukrainian Exclusive Economic Zone (EEZ) towards the Kerch Strait stretching  from its Black Sea coast.

At the eastern region of Black Sea to the south of the Kerch Strait the Ukrainian Economic Zone adjoins the Russian Economic Zone in Black Sea. From that point starts the Russia - Ukraine border of territorial water which stretches northward for  towards the southern edge of the Kerch Strait. After that the boundary continues as the Russia - Ukraine border though the Kerch Strait and over the Azov Sea where it divides the internal waters of both countries towards the edge of land border on the northern coast of Azov Sea.

Major disputes

With Russia

Crimea
Since the 2014 Russian occupation and annexation of Crimea, Ukraine doesn't have de facto control of the peninsula, and considers it to be under temporary occupation.

Ukraine and the majority of the international community consider the Crimea to be an autonomous republic of Ukraine and Sevastopol to be one of Ukraine's cities with special status, while Russia, on the other hand, considers the Crimea to be a federal subject of Russia and Sevastopol to be one of Russia's three federal cities since the March 2014 annexation of Crimea by Russia. Since 1991 Russia also leases Sevastopol Naval Base with the current lease extending to the 2040s with an option for another extension, but the Russian State Duma approved the denunciation of this lease agreement unanimously by 433 members of parliament on 31 March 2014.

Southern and Eastern Ukraine
Since the Russian full-scale invasion of Ukraine, the Russian military has successfully captured large swaths of territory across Southern and Eastern Ukraine. On September 30, days after the Russian authorities conducted annexation referendums in four oblasts that is nearly universally considered illegitimate, Russian President Putin officially declares that they are now sovereign Russian territory, further disputing the internationally recognized Ukrainian Border.

With Romania

Snake Island (settled dispute) 

From the times of Ukraine gaining its independence, Romania has been contesting Ukraine's claims to Snake Island and parts of their territorial waters, especially their claimed Exclusive Economic Zone (EEZ).

At first, Romania did not recognize Snake Island as sovereign Ukrainian territory, but later discussions regarding its ownership ceased. However, Romania decided to reclassify the island as a rock without the rights on the adjacent territorial waters and EEZ.

Currently the dispute is settled and the Snake Island was recognized as the part of Ukrainian territory, however its adjacent waters (EEZ of Ukraine) became limited.

See also
 Maritime delimitation between Romania and Ukraine
 Bystroye Channel
 Black Sea Fleet

References

External links 

 Закон України Про державний кордон України
 Moldova-Ukraine relations, interview with Andrei Popov
 Молдова і Україна вирішили спірне територіальне питання
 Territorial settlement Palanca